Paul Bender may refer to:

 Paul Bender (bass) (1875–1947), German opera singer
 Paul Bender (jurist) (born 1933), US expert on constitutional law
 Paul F. Bender (1896–1992), American football and collegiate wrestling coach
 Paul Bender (fl. 2011–), bassist of the Australian band Hiatus Kaiyote